Justice of the Wild is a 1913 American silent short adventure film directed by Frank E. Montgomery starring Harry Van Meter, Mona Darkfeather, and Jack Messick.

Cast
 Mona Darkfeather as Mona
 Harry Van Meter as Joe
 Jack Messick as Indian Chief
 L.J Anderson as The Kid

External links

1913 films
1913 adventure films
American adventure films
American silent short films
American black-and-white films
1910s American films
Silent adventure films
1910s English-language films
1913 short films